The term secure file transfer protocol or secure FTP may refer to:

Network protocols
 SSH File Transfer Protocol — a file transfer protocol specifically developed by the IETF to run over secure shell connections
 FTP over SSH, also known as "secure FTP" — the practice of using SSH to tunnel the older, well-known File Transfer Protocol (FTP)

Computer programs
 Secure file transfer program, usually known as "sftp" — a well-known command-line program, common in Unix, for using SSH File Transfer Protocol
 Secure FTP (software) — a software package, by Glub Tech, for using FTPS (traditional FTP over SSL/TLS)

See also 
 FTPS — sometimes called "FTP Secure"
 SFTP (disambiguation)
 SFT (disambiguation)